Derailed may refer to:
 Derailment, in which a rail vehicle leaves the tracks on which it is travelling

Films
 The English language title for the 1942 Danish film Afsporet
 Derailed (2002 film), a 2002 action movie directed by and starring Jean-Claude Van Damme
 Derailed (2005 film), a 2005 thriller-drama film starring Clive Owen and Jennifer Aniston
 Derailed, a 2005 BBC1 TV movie dramatization of the Ladbroke Grove rail crash and its aftermath
 Derailed (2016 film), a 2016 action and crime movie starring Ma Dong-seok and Choi Min-ho

Others
 Derailed (novel), a thriller by James Siegel
 "Derailed" (song), a song by German pop group No Angels
 "Derailed" (Ugly Betty), an episode of the TV series Ugly Betty

See also